Ernest Delaney (5 January 1889 Jackson, Michigan – 29 August 1937) was an American racecar driver.

Indy 500 results

References

1889 births
1937 deaths
Indianapolis 500 drivers
Sportspeople from Jackson, Michigan
Racing drivers from Michigan